Jaroslava may refer to:

Jaroslava Bajerová (1910–1995), Czech gymnast
Jaroslava Brychtová (born 1924), Czech glass artist and sculptor
Jaroslava Bukvajová (born 1975), Slovak cross country skier
Jaroslava Krčálová, Czechoslovak slalom canoeist
Jaroslava Maxova (born 1957), Czech opera singer and vocal coach
Jaroslava Moserová, MU Dr.Sc. (born 1930), Czech senator, ambassador, presidential candidate, doctor, and translator
Jaroslava Schallerová (born 1956), popular Czech film star during the 1970s

See also
Gymnázium Ľudovíta Jaroslava Šuleka Komárno, high school in Komárno, Slovakia